Alvir Rural District is a rural district (dehestan) in Kharqan District, Zarandieh County, Markazi Province, Iran. At the 2006 census, its population was 3,187, in 1,046 families. The rural district has 12 villages.

References 

Rural Districts of Markazi Province
Zarandieh County